Future Days is the fourth studio album by the German experimental rock group Can, released in 1973. It was the last Can album to feature Japanese vocalist Damo Suzuki, and sees the band exploring a more atmospheric sound than their previous releases.

Content

Music
On Future Days, Can foregrounds the ambient elements they had explored on previous albums, dispensing largely with traditional rock song structures and instead "creating hazy, expansive soundscapes dominated by percolating rhythms and evocative layers of keys". PopMatters wrote that "It feels as if Future Days is driven by a coastal breeze, exuding a more pleasant, relaxed mood than anything the band had previously recorded."

Artwork
The album cover shows a Psi sign in the middle (drawn in the same style as the font used for the cover) and the I Ching symbol ding/the cauldron below the title. The surrounding graphics are based on the Jugendstil artstyle.

Some versions of the vinyl album have a slightly different cover in which the graphics don't have a light emboss or in which the lightly reflective gold tint is replaced by a flat yellow instead. These differences are also present on the CD releases.
Even though not all versions of the covers are fully identical, the tracks do not differ on any release version.

Reception 

From contemporary reviews, Ian MacDonald of NME praised the album, opining it was "an immaculate piece of work, the best German rock record so far, apart from Faust", and concluded that it was "sheer good music and is perfectly easy for anyone with a pair of ears attached to their heads to get into and thoroughly enjoy. Forget the krautrock tag. Forget how you're supposed to react." Ray Fox-Cumming of Disc gave the album a negative review, declaring the album "attempts nothing that hasn't already been done, often to death, before" while finding "some of it is quite pretty, the music is well-played, nicely spaced and unscrambled, but even after half a dozen hearings I still found most of it went in one ear and straight out the other." NME ranked it the 11th best album of the year in 1974.

From retrospective reviews, AllMusic's Anthony Tognazzini called it "fiercely progressive, calming, complex, intense, and beautiful all at once" and "one of Can's most fully realized and lasting achievements." He also praised Suzuki's vocal performances - described as "all minimal texture and shading" - as being his "most inspired", and praised the track "Bel Air" as "a gloriously expansive piece of music that progresses almost imperceptibly, ending abruptly after exactly 20 minutes."

Legacy
As of November 2020, Acclaimed Music finds Future Days to be the 697th most acclaimed album of all time.

Track listing

Personnel
Can
Holger Czukay – bass, double bass
Michael Karoli – guitar, violin
Jaki Liebezeit – drums, percussion
Irmin Schmidt – keyboards, synthesizers
Damo Suzuki – vocals, percussion

References

Sources

External links
Progarchives info & reviews on Future Days

1973 albums
Can (band) albums
United Artists Records albums
Ambient albums by German artists
Electronic albums by German artists
Progressive rock albums by German artists